Prvi poljubac (English translation: First Kiss) is the fifteenth album of Bosnian singer Halid Bešlić. It was released on 4 February 2003.

Track listing
Prvi poljubac (First Kiss)
Požuri (Hurry)
Lijepe ciganke (Beautiful Gypsy Women, featuring Omar Raković)
Stara kuća (Old House)
Grešnica (Sinner)
Lijepa pa i pametna (Beautiful and Smart)
Moja jedina (My One and Only)
Zrele kajsije (Mature Apricots)
Navika (Habit)
Kao nekada (As Before)

Bonus tracks
U meni jesen je (It is Autumn Inside of Me)
Daj da ljubim (Let Me Kiss)
Plavo oko (Blue Eye)
Sviraj nešto narodno (Play Something Folksy, featuring Donna Ares)

References

Halid Bešlić albums
2003 albums